The Embassy of the State of Palestine in Bangladesh is the diplomatic mission of the State of Palestine in Bangladesh. It is located in Dhaka.

History
Before the independence of Bangladesh, there was a Palestinian consulate in Dhaka. After independence, an office of the Palestine Liberation Organization was established in Dhaka in 1978. After the Palestinian declaration of independence in 1977, the office gained the status of an embassy.

Ambassadors

See also

List of diplomatic missions in Bangladesh
List of diplomatic missions of Palestine

References

External links

Diplomatic missions of the State of Palestine
Diplomatic missions in Dhaka
Bangladesh–State of Palestine relations